Gabrovec pri Kostrivnici is a small settlement in the Municipality of Rogaška Slatina in eastern Slovenia. The entire area belongs to the traditional Styria region and is now included in the Savinja Statistical Region.

Name
The name of the settlement was changed from Gabrovec to Gabrovec pri Kostrivici in 1953.

Kostrivnica Castle
On a hill above the settlement, remains of a fortification ditch indicate the location of a medieval castle. Locals refer to the area as Stari grad ('old castle') and it is likely all that is left of Kostrivnica Castle, mentioned in documents dating to the 13th century.

References

External links
Gabrovec pri Kostrivnici on Geopedia

Populated places in the Municipality of Rogaška Slatina